Testament of Youth is a 2014 British drama film based on the First World War memoir of the same name written by Vera Brittain. The film stars Alicia Vikander as Vera Brittain, an independent young woman who abandoned her studies at Somerville College, Oxford, to become a war nurse.  The film was directed by James Kent and written by Juliette Towhidi.

Plot
In 1914, Vera Brittain wants to escape her traditional family in Buxton by attending Oxford University with her younger brother Edward and his friends at Uppingham School, Roland Leighton and Victor Richardson. In the face of her father's opposition, she passes the entrance examination for Somerville College, Oxford. Before enrolling at Oxford, Vera and Roland—who shares her interest in writing and poetry—begin a romance, although she knows that Victor is in love with her.

After the assassination of Archduke Franz Ferdinand starts World War I, Vera helps convince her father to let Edward join the army instead of studying at Oxford; Roland and Victor also join, and Roland is the first to reach the Western Front. As long lists of casualties appear in newspapers, Vera leaves Oxford to volunteer for the Voluntary Aid Detachment as a nurse tending the wounded in a hospital in England.

His friends still see the war as exciting, but Roland tells Vera of his traumatic experiences from trench warfare at the front. He proposes to Vera; they will marry during his next home leave. Roland returns to France, now with Edward. Roland writes in late 1915 that he has been granted leave, and is safe away from the front. As Vera awaits his arrival during the Christmas holiday, Roland's crying mother tells her on the telephone that he has been killed.

The army tells Vera and Roland's family that he died "a noble and painless death". After she demands the truth, George Catlin, who saw the wounded Roland in Louvencourt, admits that Roland died from his abdominal gunshot wound in agonising pain. When Victor, blind from his own injuries, arrives at Vera's hospital, she proposes to him because he is "going to need someone and I... well, Roland would like it", but he gently turns her down before suddenly dying from his head injury.

In 1917, Vera asks to transfer to France to be closer to Edward, but her first assignment is to treat wounded Germans. She is reluctant, but learns that they suffer and die like English soldiers. Vera finds Edward among the dying, and helps to save his life. He shows her a letter from his "dear friend" Geoffrey Thurlow, implying the two men were lovers. After Edward's recovery, she is glad that he is sent to the safer Italian Front. Edward insists that Vera return to her Oxford studies after the war. Vera returns home after her mother has a nervous breakdown. She sees a telegram being delivered and learns, from her father's weeping, that Edward has died.

In 1918, having lost all the young men closest to her, Vera cannot celebrate as crowds cheer the Armistice with Germany. Back at Oxford, she has nightmares about Roland's and Edward's deaths. Winifred Holtby, another student at the college, helps Vera cope with her trauma.

Vera attends a public meeting where speakers debate how to punish Germany for the war. Most of the audience is against George Catlin, who warns that "the philosophy of 'an eye for an eye'" could cause another war. Vera confesses her guilt over persuading her father to let Edward join the army, and tells of how she held the hand of a dying German soldier, who was no different from her brother or her fiancé. She says that their deaths have meaning "only if we stand together now and say 'No'" to war and revenge.

Now a pacifist, Vera promises her dead men that she will not forget them. The film ends with a dedication:

The plot of the film broadly follows the narrative of the book, but it does deviate in two significant regards: George Catlin, who entered the army in 1918, never met Roland, who died in 1915. In addition, Vera did not help save her brother Edward's life after he was wounded at the Somme in 1916; he was simply sent to the First London General Hospital, where she was a volunteer nurse. Also, as Roland is departing for the war in 1915, news of the Spanish flu is mentioned, yet the pandemic would not occur until 1918.

Cast

 Alicia Vikander as Vera Brittain
 Kit Harington as Roland Leighton
 Colin Morgan as Victor Richardson
 Taron Egerton as Edward Brittain
 Dominic West as Mr Brittain
 Emily Watson as Mrs Brittain
 Joanna Scanlan as Aunt Belle
 Hayley Atwell as Hope
 Jonathan Bailey as Geoffrey Thurlow
 Alexandra Roach as Winifred Holtby
 Anna Chancellor as Mrs Leighton
 Miranda Richardson as Miss Lorimer
 Charlotte Hope as Betty

Production
In February 2009, it was announced that BBC Films was developing a feature film adaptation of memoir Testament of Youth written by Vera Brittain, about women's experiences during World War I. The BBC had previously adapted the book as a five-part television serial which was transmitted on BBC2 in 1979 with Cheryl Campbell as Vera Brittain.

Film development had the support of Shirley Williams, Brittain's daughter, and of Mark Bostridge, Brittain's biographer, editor, and one of her literary executors, who was reportedly acting as consultant on the film. Heyday Films' producers David Heyman and Rosie Alison would be producing the film with the BBC, while Juliette Towhidi was adapting the film. On 4 February 2014 Protagonist Pictures came on board to handle international sales and launched the film at the Berlin International Film Festival in that month.

Casting
Saoirse Ronan was initially attached to play Brittain. On 4 February 2014, Kit Harington joined the cast to play the role of Brittain's fiancé Roland Leighton. On 13 February 2014, Colin Morgan, Alexandra Roach and Taron Egerton were announced to have joined the film's cast. An ensemble cast was confirmed as filming began, including Dominic West, Emily Watson, Joanna Scanlan, Hayley Atwell, Jonathan Bailey and Anna Chancellor.

Filming
Principal photography began on 16 March 2014 in London, Oxford and Yorkshire, including a number of locations across the North York Moors. It substituted Merton College, Oxford in the scenes showing Brittain's time as a student at Somerville College, arguing that filming in Somerville itself would have been too difficult in light of the new buildings constructed there since the film's time period.

The railway station scenes, the train interiors, and the scene in the railway cafe, were shot at Keighley railway station, using trains provided by the Keighley and Worth Valley Railway. The landscape shots of period trains were filmed at the heritage track of the North Yorkshire Moors Railway. Ravenscar and Robin Hood's Bay in the North York Moors were locations for the coastal shots. The Welbeck Abbey estate in Nottinghamshire provided several locations, including the scenes at Uppingham School, Melrose House and the Étaples field hospital. The lake scenes were filmed in Darley Dale in Derbyshire. Hospital corridor scenes were filmed in Sheffield Town Hall.

To portray the war-blinded Victor Richardson, Morgan interviewed a series of ex-service men and women; he contacted Blind Veterans UK and spent a day at the charity's Brighton Centre, where he received the same training as blind veterans, while blindfolded.

Music
The musical score was composed by Max Richter, after taking over for Mark Bradshaw who was previously attached.

Distribution

Marketing
The first trailer was released on 1 August 2014. The second trailer was then released on 10 November 2014.

A book by Mark Bostridge, titled Vera Brittain and the First World War: The Story of Testament of Youth, was published by Bloomsbury Publishing on 4 December 2014. The book includes a chapter on the making of the film.

Theatrical release
The film was released in wide distribution in the UK on 16 January 2015. Its world premiere was in The Centrepiece Gala, supported by the Mayor of London, at the British Film Institute London Film Festival on 14, 16 and 17 October 2014. On 16 January 2015, Sony Pictures Classics acquired the distribution rights to the film for North America, Latin America and Asia from Protagonist Pictures. The film was released in the USA on 5 June 2015 and in France on 24 June 2015.

Reception

Critical response
Testament of Youth was well received upon its release. Review aggregator Rotten Tomatoes reports that 84% of 125 film critics have given the film a positive review, with an average rating of 7/10. The website's critics consensus reads, "Testament of Youth is well-acted and beautifully filmed, adding up to an enriching if not adventurous experience for fans of British period dramas." Metacritic, which assigns a weighted average score out of 100 to reviews from mainstream critics, gives the film a score of 77 based on 34 reviews. Audiences surveyed by CinemaScore gave the film an average grade of "B" on an A+ to F scale.

Awards and nominations

References

External links
 
 
 
 
 Official screenplay

2014 films
2014 war drama films
2010s historical drama films
Anti-war films about World War I
BBC Film films
Heyday Films films
Lionsgate films
British historical drama films
British war drama films
Films scored by Max Richter
Drama films based on actual events
Films based on biographies
Films based on non-fiction books
Films produced by David Heyman
Films set in 1914
Films set in 1917
Films set in 1918
Films set in London
Films set in Oxford
Films shot in Derbyshire
Films shot in London
Films shot in Nottinghamshire
Films shot in Oxfordshire
Films shot in Yorkshire
Medical-themed films
Testament of Youth
World War I films based on actual events
Biographical films about poets
Films set in Malta
2014 directorial debut films
2014 drama films
Films directed by James Kent (director)
Films shot at Pinewood Studios
2010s English-language films
2010s British films
English-language drama films